Ərəbxana (also, Arabkhana) is a village and municipality in the Kurdamir Rayon of Azerbaijan.

Notable natives 

 Zabit Guliyev — National Hero of Azerbaijan.

References 

Populated places in Kurdamir District